The Gregg River is a short river in west-central Alberta, Canada. The river is named after John James Gregg (1840–1941), a prospector and trapper prominent in the area.

Course
The Gregg River forms at the confluence of a number of minor creeks near the Cardinal River Coal Mine, at the base of Mount Sir Harold Mitchell. The river then flows northwest, taking on a number of tributary creeks before joining the McLeod River, which in turn flows into the Athabasca River. The Gregg is bridged by Alberta Highway 40.

Tributaries
Berry's Creek
Sphinx Creek
Drinnan Creek
Warden Creek
Teepee Creek
Wigwam Creek

See also
List of Alberta rivers

References

Rivers of Alberta